In mathematics, local symbol may refer to:

 The local Artin symbol in Artin reciprocity
 The local symbol used to formulate Weil reciprocity
 A Steinberg symbol on a local field